Neoregelia menescalii is a species of flowering plant in the genus Neoregelia. This species is endemic to Brazil.

References

menescalii
Flora of Brazil